Balkan pipeline may refer to:

Balkan Stream, a natural gas pipeline from Turkey to Hungary
Trans-Balkan pipeline, a natural gas pipeline between Turkey and Ukraine